San Estanislao de Kostka (usually referred to as San Estanislao or, more commonly, Santaní) is a city and district in the department of San Pedro, Paraguay.

History 
San Estanislao was founded on November 13, 1749 by Father Sebastián de Yegros, a Jesuit priest from Asunción after Saint Stanislaus Kostka. The town was founded as a Jesuit mission with the goal of converting the surrounding Indian population.

The city is named for Stanisław Kostka, a Polish priest who was canonized by Pope Benedict XIII on November 13, 1726, 23 years before San Estanislao was founded.

Santaní, as the city is commonly referred to locally and throughout Paraguay, is a contraction of the word for saint in Spanish ("san") and the word for Estanislao in Guaraní ("taní"). People from Santaní are referred to as "santanianos" in Spanish.

In 1869, during the Paraguayan War, San Estanislao was briefly the seat of the national government under Marshall Francisco Solano López. Following battles elsewhere in Paraguay, López and several of his regiments passed through the city. López governed from the city from August 23 to 31.

Immigration to San Estanislao 
Around 1880, San Estanislao became home to immigrants both from other parts of Paraguay and from Europe, especially from Germany and Italy. The influence of the Italian immigrants, in particular, can still be seen today in various buildings in Italian styles and the last names of some of the oldest Santaniana families.

Decades later, around 1920, Santaní also received immigrants from Lebanon. After arriving at Itacurubí del Rosario, some of the new arrivals made their way to Santaní. Other countries that sent relatively large numbers of immigrants to the city were France, Portugal, Brazil and Spain.

Economy 
After 1870, during the postwar period, Santaní and the surrounding countryside were sustained mostly through agriculture and forestry. Tobacco was the major crop, and its production and packaging for export were a main contributor of jobs.

Today the primary economic activity continues to be agriculture, especially cotton, mandioca, soy and sesame. Beef and milk production, forestry, commerce, and regional services (medical treatment, banking, and construction) also contribute to the city's economy.

Education 
San Estanislao is home to schools ranging from primary- to university-level, both public and private.

In 1994 a College of Economic Sciences was established in the city as part of the UNA. There are more than 10 universities in downtown Santani.

Transportation 
Travel time between San Estanislao and Asunción (151 km away) was greatly reduced with the inauguration of Route 3 in May 2004. Buses leave the terminal to Asuncion every half an hour.

Night Life 
Santani is a college town, and its many plazas come to life after 9pm when students get out of class. Sidewalk cafes serve pizza and beer from 6pm to midnight, and hamburger stands stay open all night. It is common for people to cruise the strip slowly on their motorcycles, beer in hand and music blasting. There is one karaoke bar called "La Rustica" which turns into a dance club after 12 or 12:30am. The bartender/DJ plays everything from cumbia to reggaeton to Brazilian music and reggae.

References and external links 
  Maps and weather for San Estanislao

Populated places in the San Pedro Department, Paraguay